26 (also written as 26 (The Band), [26] and 26(Twenty Six)) is an Australian musical outfit founded in 2004 by friends Nick O'Donnell (lead vocals/guitar) and Drew Fellows (keyboardist/vocals), who later recruited Ross Duckworth (bass/vocals) and Iain Wilson (drums/vocals). Originally categorised as indie rock, 26 has since employed a variety of guest artists and choirs to produce a sound that is unique to the band.

History
The band's first album, The King Must Die, was recorded by O'Donnell before he had a band and was released in Australia through Floodboy Records and MGM Distribution in 2005. The album received national airplay and The King Must Die was honoured as the feature album on Sydney radio station FBI 94.5 FM's The Album Show. With the band's growing popularity, 26 toured Australia in 2006 for the release of their single, "Friendly Fire", which went on to win the 2006 Queensland Song Award for Best Rock Song and was also a finalist in The Courier-Mail People's Choice Awards. The single also received airplay on national youth network Triple J and further exposure on FBI 94.5 FM.

With the release of their second album, Births, Deaths & Marriages, in 2008, 26's track "Aloha" was featured on the 3 website. That same week, 26 was chosen as one of only forty acts to showcase at Queensland's 2008 Big Sound Conference, one of the most respected and fastest-growing music business events in the Asia-Pacific region.

In 2010, 26 toured the US, Canada, Hong Kong and the UK, as well as performing at the MUSEXPO 2010 in West Hollywood on 26 April.. In August 2011, 26 returned to the northern hemisphere for an extensive national UK tour, including performances at the Y-Not Festival and the Edinburgh Festival.

26's third album, Sunshine Salvation, was released on 26 October 2012, with "The Outside" announced as the album's first single. To launch their 2012 album, Sunshine Salvation, the band played an intimate, start-to-finish pre-release show for their Brisbane-based friends, families and fans at the Black Bear Lodge in Fortitude Valley, Queensland.

Band members
Nick O'Donnell: lead vocals, guitar
Drew Fellows: keys, vocals
Ross Duckworth: bass, vocals
Iain Wilson: drums, vocals

Discography

Albums

Awards

Q Song Awards
The Queensland Music Awards (previously known as Q Song Awards) are annual awards celebrating Queensland, Australia's brightest emerging artists and established legends. They commenced in 2006.

 (wins only)
|-
| 2006
| "Friendly Fire"
| Rock Song of the Year
| 
|}

References

External links
Official Site
Triple-J Unearthed

Musical groups from Brisbane
Australian indie rock groups